Jesús Romagosa (1898 – death date unknown) was a Cuban outfielder in the Negro leagues in the 1920s.

A native of Cuba, Romagosa played for the Cuban Stars (East) in 1920. In seven recorded games, he posted five hits in 28 plate appearances.

References

External links
Baseball statistics and player information from Baseball-Reference Black Baseball Stats and Seamheads

Date of birth missing
Year of death missing
Place of birth missing
Place of death missing
Cuban Stars (East) players
Baseball outfielders
1898 births
Cuban expatriate baseball players in the United States